The 2016 season was the New Orleans Saints' 50th in the National Football League (NFL), their 41st playing home games at the Mercedes-Benz Superdome, and their 10th under head coach Sean Payton. The Saints matched their 7–9 record from 2014 and 2015, and missed the playoffs for the third year in a row. One highlight from the season includes quarterback Drew Brees' first return to San Diego for the first time since the Chargers released him at the end of the 2005 season, also where Brees played his first five seasons in. This came 10 years after the Chargers released Brees after the Saints' previous regular season meetings with the Chargers were home games for the Saints, and including a 2008 meeting at Wembley Stadium in London, a game which New Orleans was designated as the home team.

Draft

Notes
 The Saints traded their 2016 sixth-round selection, along with their 2015 sixth-round selection to the Washington Redskins in exchange for the Washington Redskins 2015 fifth-round selection.
 The Saints traded their 2016 third and fourth-round selection to the New England Patriots in exchange for the New England Patriots second-round selection (61st overall).
 The Saints traded their 2016 fifth-round selection, along with their 2017 fifth-round selection to the Washington Redskins in exchange for the Washington Redskins fourth-round selection (120th overall).

Staff

Final roster

Schedule

Preseason

Regular season

Game summaries

Week 1: vs. Oakland Raiders

The Saints opened the season at home against the Oakland Raiders in the Mercedes-Benz Superdome. Despite 423 passing yards—including a franchise-record 98-yard touchdown pass to receiver Brandin Cooks—and four touchdowns from Drew Brees, the Raiders came from behind to win 35–34. The Raiders scored a touchdown with 47 seconds remaining in the game to bring them within one point. Instead of kicking an extra point, Raiders coach Jack Del Rio ordered a two-point conversion, which quarterback Derek Carr successfully converted with a pass to receiver Michael Crabtree. The Saints received the kickoff and Brees led the team down the field in two plays to give kicker Wil Lutz a chance at a game-winning 61-yard field goal, but the kick went wide left. The Saints defense was criticized for its performance, as it gave up 210 yards and 22 points in the fourth quarter.

Week 2: at New York Giants

Week 3: vs. Atlanta Falcons

Week 4: at San Diego Chargers

For the first time in 11 years, Drew Brees returned to San Diego to face his former team, the Chargers, where he began his NFL career. In the game, the Saints got their first win of the season, rallying in the 4th quarter after trailing 34–21 to win 35–34, mostly due to two key fumbles by the Chargers.

Week 6: vs. Carolina Panthers

Week 7: at Kansas City Chiefs

Week 8: vs. Seattle Seahawks
The Saints meet the Seahawks for the first time in 3 years. It was also the Saints' first victory against Seattle since the 2010 season.

Week 9: at San Francisco 49ers
The Saints travel to Levi's Stadium to match up with the 49ers. For the first time since the 2013 season, the Saints defeated the 49ers.

Week 10: vs. Denver Broncos

Week 11: at Carolina Panthers

As part of Color Rush, the Saints wore all-white uniforms for this game, inspired by the ones they wore in 1975. Due to this, it was the first time the Saints have worn white pants since 1985 and the second season they wore all-white uniforms in franchise history, the first being the 1975 season. The Saints went into the fourth quarter with a 20-point deficit to the Panthers. The Saints rallied and got within three with 5:11 left to go in the game, but the Panthers were able to hold them off.

Week 12: vs. Los Angeles Rams
The Saints were able to defeat the Rams for the first time since the 2010 season.

Week 13: vs. Detroit Lions

To celebrate 50 seasons in the NFL, the Saints wore special 1967–75 throwback uniforms. It was only worn for this game.

Week 14: at Tampa Bay Buccaneers

Week 15: at Arizona Cardinals
With the win against Arizona, the Saints improved to 6-8. This also marked the only season in which the Saints swept the NFC West division.

Week 16: vs. Tampa Bay Buccaneers

Week 17: at Atlanta Falcons
Because the Saints lost to the Falcons, they finish the season with a 7-9 record for the third straight season. The Saints were also swept by the Falcons for the first time since the 2014 season.

Standings

Division

Conference

References

External links
 2016 New Orleans Saints at Pro-Football-Reference.com

New Orleans
New Orleans Saints seasons
New Orleans Saints